The 4th Writers Guild of America Awards honored the best film writers of 1951. Winners were announced in 1952.

Winners & Nominees

Film
Winners are listed first highlighted in boldface.

References

External links
WGA.org

1951
W
1951 in American cinema